Herbert Louis Rooney (born 1940 - c. early 1990s) was an American record producer who was responsible for writing, producing and singing bass on songs by the Exciters and for writing and producing the sample staple Synthetic Substitution by Melvin Bliss.

Between 1964 and the mid-1980s at time of his death Herb Rooney was married to Barbara Rooney. They married in 1959 and had 3 children. He also had 4 children by lead singer Brenda Reid, one son, Cory Rooney,  who played keyboard for Herb and Brenda when touring and 3 daughters and produced for Mariah Carey, Mary J. Blige, Jessica Simpson, Jennifer Lopez, Marc Anthony, Thalia, Destiny's Child, and many more.

Post-The Exciters saw Rooney running his own cosmetics firm. He died in the early 1990s.

References

1941 births
1990s deaths